Season three of El Artista del Año, titled El artista del año: El dúo perfecto, premiered on September 29, 2018, on the América Televisión network.

This season brings together former contestants from the previous two seasons and new participants who compete in couples throughout the competition. On October 27, the live show was canceled due to technical problems, so the fifth week will be held next Saturday.

Cast

Contestants 
The cast is made up of the former contestants of the first season, Luis Baca, Rossana Fernández-Maldonado, Pedro Loli, Micheille Soifer and Cielo Torres, along with the former contestants of the second season, Kevin Blow, Daniela Darcourt, Mirella Paz, Jonathan Rojas and Shantall Young Oneto. In addition, four new competitors entered, Amy Gutiérrez, Vernis Hernández, Stephanie Orúe and Manolo Rojas, giving a total of fourteen contestants. With a total of fourteen contestants, seven couples are the participants. During the first two weeks, the three couples with the highest score continued together while the other four were exchanged with each other. Finally, in the third week, the judges decided the formation of the duos based on the performances made up to that moment.

Hosts and judges 
Gisela Valcárcel and Jaime "Choca" Mandros returned as hosts, while Morella Petrozzi, Lucho Cáceres, Fiorella Rodríguez and Cecilia Bracamonte returned as judges. Santi Lesmes, who served as guest judge in previous seasons, joined the show as the fifth judge.

Scoring charts 

Red numbers indicate the lowest score for each week
Green numbers indicate the highest score for each week
 the couple eliminated of the week
 the sentenced couple saved in the duel
 the sentenced couples who will face each other in the duel

Average score chart 
This table only counts performances scored on a 50-point scale.

Higher and lower scores 
This table has the highest and lowest scores of each contestants performance according to the 50-point scale.

Weekly scores 
Individual judges' scores in the charts below (given in parentheses) are listed in this order from left to right: Morella Petrozzi, Lucho Cáceres, Fiorella Rodríguez, Santi Lesmes, Cecilia Bracamonte.

Week 1: Premiere Night 
The couples interpreted different musical genres.
Running order

Week 2: Party Night 
Running order

Week 3: Movie Night 
Running order

Week 4: Famous Duets Night 
Running order

Notes

References

External links 
 

Peruvian television shows